The Cricket Annual was a compact cricket annual publication published in 1961 and 1962. This was the final name of a cricket annual that had first appeared in 1895, and was before it was re-named to become the re-styled Playfair Cricket Annual. 

In 1962 the Playfair titles (including the Playfair Cricket Annual) were acquired by Dickens Press which had just published The Cricket Annual. In November 1962 editor Roy Webber died suddenly and the decision was made to combine the two annuals so that in 1963, Dickens published a new style Playfair Cricket Annual, using the same name but basing the size, format and price on The Cricket Annual.

Background
The Cricket Annual was one in a long line of publications starting in 1895, with many different titles but with a continuity of format and style. They are pocket book size (approx 9.8 x 13.6 cm) but pre-1928 inaccurately trimmed and size varies (1906 is 8.9 x 13 cm). Pre-1915 books usually contained 96 pages (1908 = 80). From 1904-1914 they were edited by Alfred Gibson (Rover) and then for one year in 1921 by 'Mentor'. From 1922 until 1939 the editor was Frank Thorogood, in 1946 Percy Rudd, and then Crawford White until 1957 when he was joined by Roy Webber. Good quality copies prior to 1921 are rare and the 1895-1899 Star and Leader Cricket Manuals is difficult to find in any condition. The early annuals (pre-1914) sold for one penny (1d). When they reappeared after the First World War the price was 4d (1923 2d) and then in 1929 reduced to 3d until 1939. Post-1946, as the number of pages grew, the cost rose in increments from 6d to one shilling and six pence (1/6) by 1957.

Titles
 1895-1899 Star and Leader Cricket Manual
 1900-1908 Morning Leader Cricket Annual
 1909-1911 Morning Leader Cricket and Sports Annual
 1912 Morning Leader Cricket Annual
 1913-1914 Daily News and Leader Cricket Annual
 1921-1926 Daily News Cricket and Tennis Annual
 1927-1930 Daily News Cricket Annual
 1931-1939 News Chronicle Cricket Annual
 1946-1956 News Chronicle Cricket Annual
 1957-1958 News Chronicle & Daily Dispatch Cricket Annual
 1959-1960 News Chronicle Cricket Annual
 1961-1962 The Cricket Annual
 1963-2013 Playfair Cricket Annual

Details

Editions produced since 1928:-

For editions of the annual 1963-present see the Playfair Cricket Annual.

References

Defunct cricket magazines
Annual magazines published in the United Kingdom
Magazines established in 1961
Magazines disestablished in 1962
Sports magazines published in the United Kingdom
Defunct magazines published in the United Kingdom